Peter John McGovern (28 October 1927 – 1 April 2006) was an English songwriter and activist.

Life and career
Pete McGovern was born in Liverpool, England, on 28 October 1927. Both of his parents were Irish. His father, Thomas McGovern, was from Collon, County Louth, Ireland and his mother, Annie Dillon, was from Galbally, County Limerick. Pete was born in Regent Street, off the dock road north of the city centre.

McGovern attended St. Edward's School, West Derby and Queen Elizabeth's School, Anfield. He worked for many years on the railways and was an active trade unionist and campaigner.

His main claim to fame is that he wrote "In My Liverpool Home", a song that has become an anthem or folk tune for the people of Liverpool. It was recorded by the folk group The Spinners.

The original version of "In My Liverpool Home" was written by McGovern in the early 1960s, but many verses have been added since.

The first line of the song is:"I was born in Liverpool, down by the docks"

Death
McGovern died in Trawsfynydd, North Wales, on 1 April 2006.

Family
McGovern's granddaughter, Alison McGovern, was elected MP for Wirral South in the 2010 general election.

References

External links
Lyrics Playground

1927 births
2006 deaths
People from Bromborough
English male singer-songwriters
English activists
Musicians from Liverpool
English people of Irish descent
20th-century English singers
20th-century British male singers
20th-century English male writers